Carl Jungheim (6 February 1830, Düsseldorf - 6 June 1886, Düsseldorf) was a German landscape painter, associated with the Düsseldorfer Malerschule.

Biography 
From 1847 to 1852, he studied at the Kunstakademie Düsseldorf with Friedrich Wilhelm von Schadow and the landscape painter, Johann Wilhelm Schirmer. He then took several study trips to Switzerland, Tyrolia and Italy (1856), where he travelled in the company of his fellow painters, August Leu and Albert Flamm. He initially focused on painting mountain scenes from the Alps and the Harz range. His later work displays a preference for Italian landscapes and shows the influence of Oswald Achenbach. 

At the 1873 Vienna World's Fair, he was represented with three paintings. He also gave private lessons.

His son,  also became a well known landscape painter.

References

Further reading 
 Jungheim, Karl. In: Hermann Alexander Müller: Biographisches Künstler-Lexikon. Verlag des Bibliographischen Instituts, Leipzig 1882, pg.288 f. (Online)
 Jungheim, Karl. In: Friedrich von Boetticher: Malerwerke des neunzehnten Jahrhunderts. Beitrag zur Kunstgeschichte. Vol.I, Dresden 1891, pg.630 f.
 Hans Paffrath (Ed.): Lexikon der Düsseldorfer Malerschule 1819–1918. Vol.2: Haach–Murtfeldt. Published by the Kunstmuseum Düsseldorf im Ehrenhof and the Galerie Paffrath. Bruckmann, Munich 1998, pg.201.

External links 

 More works by Jungheim @ ArtNet

1830 births
1886 deaths
German landscape painters
Artists from Düsseldorf